In enzymology, an acyl-CoA oxidase is an enzyme that catalyzes the chemical reaction

acyl-CoA + O2  trans-2,3-dehydroacyl-CoA + H2O2

Thus, the two substrates of this enzyme are acyl-CoA and O2, whereas its two products are trans-2,3-dehydroacyl-CoA and H2O2.

This enzyme belongs to the family of oxidoreductases, specifically those acting on the CH-CH group of donor with oxygen as acceptor.  The systematic name of this enzyme class is acyl-CoA:oxygen 2-oxidoreductase. Other names in common use include fatty acyl-CoA oxidase, acyl coenzyme A oxidase, and fatty acyl-coenzyme A oxidase.  This enzyme participates in 3 metabolic pathways: fatty acid metabolism, polyunsaturated fatty acid biosynthesis, and ppar signaling pathway.  It employs one cofactor, FAD.

Structural studies

See also
 ACOX1
 ACOX3

References

 
 

EC 1.3.3
Flavoproteins
Enzymes of known structure